Brady Ralph Paxton (born January 21, 1947, in Bancroft, West Virginia) is an American politician and a Democratic member of the West Virginia House of Delegates representing District 13 since his April 22, 1999 appointment to fill the vacancy caused by the resignation of Representative Gary Tillis. Paxton served non-consecutively from January 1993 until January 1995.

Education
Paxton earned his BS from West Virginia State College (now West Virginia State University).

Elections
2012 Paxton and appointed Representative Helen Martin were unopposed for the May 8, 2012 Democratic Primary where Paxton placed first with 2,764 votes (57.0%). Paxton placed first in the four-way two-position November 6, 2012 General election with 6,663 votes (27.8%) ahead of Republican nominee Scott Cadle, returning 2008 and 2010 Republican nominee Brian Scott, and unseated Representative Martin.
1994 Paxton was initially elected in the 1994 Democratic Primary and the November 8, 1994 General election.
2000 Paxton placed in the three-way 2000 Democratic Primary and was elected in the four-way two-position November 7, 2000 General election alongside fellow Democratic nominee Dale Martin against Republican nominees Charlie Bonnett and Jack McLane.
2002 Paxton and Representative Martin were challenged in the three-way 2002 Democratic Primary and were re-elected in the three-way two-position November 5, 2002 General election against returning Republican 2000 opponent Jack McLane.
2004 Paxton and Representative Martin were challenged in the five-way 2004 Democratic Primary and were re-elected in the four-way two-position November 2, 2004 General election against Republican nominee Christopher Wood and returning 2000 and 2002 Republican opponent Jack McLane.
2006 Paxton and Representative Martin were challenged in the three-way 2006 Democratic Primary and were re-elected in the three-way two-position November 7, 2006 General election against Republican nominee Penny Dick.
2008 Paxton placed first in the three-way May 13, 2008 Democratic Primary with 3,886 votes (38.6%), and placed first in the four-way two-position November 4, 2008 General election with 8,369 votes (22.9%) ahead of incumbent Representative Martin (D) and Republican nominees James McCormick and Brian Scott.
2010 Paxton and Representative Martin were unopposed for the May 11, 2010 Democratic Primary where Paxton placed first with 1,995 votes (52.7%), and placed first in the three-way two-position November 2, 2010 General election with 6,175 votes (35.0%) ahead of incumbent Martin (D) and returning 2008 Republican challenger Brian Scott; Representative Martin died during the session and his wife was appointed to finish the term.

References

External links
Official page at the West Virginia Legislature

Brady Paxton at Ballotpedia
Brady Paxton at OpenSecrets

1947 births
Living people
Democratic Party members of the West Virginia House of Delegates
People from Putnam County, West Virginia
United States Army soldiers
West Virginia State University alumni
People from Poca, West Virginia